The Tahuamanu River is a river of Bolivia and Peru.

See also
List of rivers of Bolivia

References
Rand McNally, The New International Atlas, 1993.

Rivers of Peru
Rivers of Madre de Dios Region
Rivers of Pando Department